The Estonian Football Association (EJL) is the governing body of football, beach soccer and futsal in Estonia, established on 14 December 1921. It organizes the football league, including the championship which is called Meistriliiga, Estonian Cup and the Estonian national football team. It is based in Tallinn. EJL became a member of FIFA in 1923, but following Estonia's annexation by the Soviet Union it was disbanded. It became a member again in 1992 after Estonia reinstated its independence.

Controversy
In 2017, FIFA fined the Estonian Football Association 30,000 Swiss francs (26,000 euros) and gave them a warning because of an incident where Bosnia and Herzegovina fans threw burning material onto the field.

References

External links
  
 Old Estonian Football Association Official Site 
 Estonia at FIFA Site
 Estonia at UEFA Site

Estonia
Football in Estonia
Futsal in Estonia
Sports organizations established in 1921
Football
1921 establishments in Estonia